Mount Laguna Observatory (MLO) is an astronomical observatory owned and operated by San Diego State University (SDSU). The telescope was operated in partnership with the University of Illinois at Urbana-Champaign (UIUC) until 2000. MLO was dedicated on June 19, 1968, seven years after SDSU's Department of Astronomy became an independent academic department of SDSU's College of Sciences. The dedication took place during the 1968 summer meeting of the Astronomical Society of the Pacific. Currently SDSU is working with University of Kansas (KU), and UNC Chapel Hill on various projects.

Telescopes

 The  MLO 40-inch Telescope is a Cassegrain reflector built by Astro Mechanics in 1966.  It was originally fitted with a  primary mirror which has since been replaced.  It is known informally as the Illinois telescope because it was located at UIUC's Prairie Observatory until 1981.
 The  Clifford Smith 24-inch Telescope is a Cassegrain reflector.  It was built by the SDSU Department of Astronomy and used at the main campus from 1961 to 1966.  In 1971 it was installed at MLO after modifications.
 The  Reginald Buller 21-inch Visitors' Telescope was built in 1950 by J.W. Fecker, Inc.  It was donated to SDSU by Reginald Buller and dedicated at MLO in 1988.  It is used primarily by students for direct viewing, and for outreach.
 The EvryScope is a Multiple aperture (24x)  survey telescope taking Appx. 8000 square degree fields every two minutes. It is a collaboration between SDSU and UNC.

Future telescopes
 The  50-inch Phillips Claud Telescope. Originally planned in 2009, installation of the telescope began in late 2013. , the telescope installation had not been completed.

Former telescopes

 A  telescope built by Boller and Chivens was the first telescope at the observatory, and was replaced by the Claud telescope.
 A  telescope built by Nishimura and used by visitors was moved to the UCSD campus in 1988.  It was replaced by the Buller telescope.
 The  Ultra-Light Technology for Research in Astronomy (ULTRA) telescope was a test bed for lightweight carbon-fiber mirrors.  It was located in the 0.4 m Boller and Chivens building from 2006 until 2008.  Before it was installed, the original dome was replaced with a larger one, and the mount upgraded.  The project was collaboration of SDSU, KU, Dartmouth College, and Composite Mirror Applications, Inc. (CMA) of Tucson, Arizona.

See also
 Palomar Observatory
 List of astronomical observatories

References

External links
 Department of Astronomy at San Diego State University
 Current conditions at MLO Note: May be using a Self-Signed SSL certificate
 Mount Laguna Observatory Clear Sky Clock Forecasts of observing conditions.
 EvryScope Project at UNC

Astronomical observatories in California
Astronomy institutes and departments
Buildings and structures in San Diego County, California
California State University
San Diego State University
University of Illinois Urbana-Champaign
University of Kansas
University of North Carolina at Chapel Hill buildings
1968 establishments in California
Cleveland National Forest